Deraeocoris is a genus of plant bugs in the family Miridae. There are at least 210 described species in Deraeocoris.

See also
 List of Deraeocoris species

References

Further reading

External links
 Biolib

Miridae genera
Deraeocorini